Lora Lawrence (L.L. "Slim") Corum (January 8, 1899 - March 7, 1949) was co-winner of the 1924 Indianapolis 500.

Biography
L.L. Corum was born on January 8, 1899, in Jonesville, Indiana to Margaret Hannah Marquette and William Cecil Corum.

During the 1924 Indianapolis 500 Corum, in third place, was replaced by the more well-known Joe Boyer on lap 109 on orders of the head of the team after Boyer's car developed trouble. While Corum received the prize money and was credited with the victory (later this was changed to the two drivers being co-winners), Boyer received most of the credit from the racing community. Corum qualified for the 1928 Indianapolis 500, but suffered a crash during a practice run on the morning of the race.

Corum left racing in 1933, but returned in 1938 as a mechanic, working for Harry Miller's five car team at the Indianapolis 500.

He died on March 7, 1949, at age 50.

Indianapolis 500 results

References

1899 births
1949 deaths
Indianapolis 500 drivers
Indianapolis 500 winners
People from Columbus, Indiana
Racing drivers from Indiana
AAA Championship Car drivers